The 1998 United States Senate election in Hawaii was held November 3, 1998 alongside other elections to the United States Senate in other states as well as elections to the United States House of Representatives and various state and local elections. Incumbent Democratic U.S. Senator Daniel Inouye won re-election to a seventh term.

Major candidates

Democratic 
 Daniel Inouye, incumbent U.S. Senator

Republican 
 Crystal Young, legislative aide

Results

See also 
 1998 United States Senate elections

References 

United States Senate
1998
Hawaii
Daniel Inouye